Adam Franklin (born 7 October 1968) is an English guitarist, singer, and songwriter who is the front-man of the alternative rock band Swervedriver (1989–99, 2007–present) as well as the main creative force behind Toshack Highway (1999–2006) and currently releases records under his own name with his touring band Bolts of Melody. Franklin has released five independent studio albums in addition to three albums and two EPs under the moniker "Toshack Highway". He also sings and plays guitar in Magnetic Morning, a collaboration with Sam Fogarino from Interpol who have released an EP and a full-length album. Franklin is also a longtime member of the Sophia collective.

Discography

Adam Franklin (& Bolts of Melody)

Studio albums

Singles and appearances

Live studio sessions

Toshack Highway

Magnetic Morning

References

External links
Auralgasms interview, July 2007.

1968 births
Living people
People from Oxford
English male guitarists
English male singer-songwriters
English rock guitarists
English rock singers
Alternative rock guitarists
Alternative rock singers
Second Motion Records artists